Dilys Breese (born 2 June 1932, Abergavenny, Monmouthshire; died 22 August 2007) was a natural history television producer for the BBC and an ornithologist with the British Trust for Ornithology, who commemorate her contribution by awarding the Dilys Breese Medal, funded by her bequest to them.

Breese was brought up in Wales, she was educated at Oswestry Girls' High School, then graduated from St Andrews in 1954, with an MA in English Literature and Language.

Radio 

After graduation, she applied for a position as a trainee studio manager with BBC radio. While working on shows like Woman's Hour she developed an interest in natural history, and by 1970 was producing the majority of BBC Bristol's natural history output, with presenter Derek Jones. With Jones, she created the successful radio series The Living World and Wildlife.

Television 

In 1970, Breese joined the BBC Natural History Unit, where she produced television shows including The World About Us, Wildlife on One and The Natural World.

She left the BBC in 1991 and set up her own company, Kestrel Productions, making several short programmes until deteriorating health prevented her from working.

Conservation work 

Breese became a council member of the British Trust for Ornithology in 1973 and was its Honorary Secretary from 1998–2001. She chaired the working group developing 'Garden BirdWatch', which has since become the largest year-round citizen science project in the world. In 1983, she was the first recipient of the BTO's Golden Jubilee Medal for outstanding service to the Trust.

Notable films
The Great Hedgehog Mystery (1982) - first film to show hedgehogs mating
In-Flight Movie (1987) - won at the New York International Film and TV Festival; and at the Wildscreen film festival in 1988
Meerkats United (1987) - voted the best wildlife documentary of all time by BBC viewers
Trivial Pursuit: the Natural Mystery of Play (1988) - audience of 12 million

Bibliography

References

External links

British ornithologists
Women ornithologists
BBC people
British television producers
British women television producers
British Trust for Ornithology people
1932 births
2007 deaths
Alumni of the University of St Andrews
British nature writers
20th-century British zoologists
20th-century British businesspeople